An incomplete list of schools in Brussels, Belgium.

A

ACE of Brussels
Brussels American School

B
British School of Brussels

C
Collège Saint-Michel d'Etterbeek

E
European School of Brussels I
European School of Brussels II
European School of Brussels III
European School of Brussels IV
Ecole Internationale Montgomery

F
La Futaie

I
International School of Brussels
Institut Saint-André
International School of Flanders - ISF Waterloo
International School of Flanders - ISF Tervuren

K
Le Karenberg

S
La Sapinière
St John Berchmans College

Brussles
Schools